Rick Newman (February 21, 1941 – February 20, 2023) was an American comedy club owner who in 1972 opened the comedy club Catch a Rising Star in Manhattan on First Avenue near East 78th Street.  It became a place to showcase emerging stand-up comedians.  Some of the most famous comedians who worked there include Robin Williams, Andy Kaufman, Jay Leno, Billy Crystal, Freddie Prinze, Richard Belzer, Joe Piscopo, and David Brenner. Singers, musicians, jugglers, and animal acts were also featured at the comedy club.

Newman had previously run a few other businesses, such as a singles bar and a steakhouse. In the 1980s, he partnered Regis Philbin and Mikhail Baryshnikov to create a restaurant on the Upper West Side of Manhattan.

Newman died at age 81.  He died one day before his birthday and one day after Richard Belzer, one of the most famous comedians to work as a comedian and emcee at his comedy club, died in France.  His wife Krysi Newman stated that he died of pancreatic cancer.

References

1941 births
2023 deaths
20th-century American businesspeople
21st-century American businesspeople
American comedy
Deaths from pancreatic cancer
Entertainers from the Bronx